Marcel Pierre Marie Le Bihan (23 April 1916-15 June 1940) was a naval officer and naval aviator of the French Navy.

Career
He joined the Navy in April 1935 then passed and got his pilot's license. Second master, he served on Dunkirk as the pilot of one of the seaplanes on board.

Sent to the CA 3 fighter flotilla in Cuers in January 1940 to protect Toulon, he fought a formation of Italian planes on 15 June 1940 on a Bloch MB.151. After being hit, he deliberately collided with one of his opponents, whom he took in his fall. Seriously injured and burned, he died a few hours later at the Brignoles hospital.

Legacy 
A French D'Estienne d'Orves-class aviso launched in 1977, has been named after him.

See also
French military ranks

References

1916 births
1940 deaths
People from Douarnenez
French Navy personnel of World War II
French World War II pilots
French military personnel killed in World War II
Pilots who performed an aerial ramming